Li Helan (born 2 January 1978) is a Chinese long-distance runner. She competed in the women's marathon at the 2004 Summer Olympics.

References

1978 births
Living people
Runners from Gansu
Chinese female long-distance runners
Chinese female marathon runners
Chinese female cross country runners
Olympic female marathon runners
Olympic athletes of China
Athletes (track and field) at the 2004 Summer Olympics
World Athletics Championships athletes for China
Asian Cross Country Championships winners